Madhasana is a village in Kheralu Taluka in Mahesana district of Gujarat State, India.

References

Villages in Mehsana district